Asfò Bussotti (2 December 1925 – 24 December 1987) was an Italian long-distance runner. He competed in the marathon at the 1952 Summer Olympics.

References

External links
 

1925 births
1987 deaths
Athletes (track and field) at the 1952 Summer Olympics
Italian male long-distance runners
Italian male marathon runners
Olympic athletes of Italy
Sportspeople from Florence
20th-century Italian people